The Hankiralli (aka Snow Rally) is a Finnish motor rally, in the European Championship. In 1981, Finnish driver Ulf Grönholm was killed in practice for this event. His son, Marcus Grönholm, later went on to become the 2000 and 2002 World Champion rally driver. Swedish driver Stig Blomqvist won the event twice, in 1971 and 1977, in a Saab 96 V4.

Rally competitions in Finland